The  is a railway line in Chiba Prefecture, Japan, operated by the Keisei Railway. The line (with direct services to and from the Keisei Main Line and Keisei Chiba Line) starts from Chiba-Chūō Station and ends at Chiharadai Station.

Stations 
 All trains are local trains that stop at every station.

History 
The line was originally planned by Kominato Railway, which obtained the government license for the new line between Hon-Chiba Station in central Chiba and Amaariki Station on the existing Kominato Railway Line in December 1957.

By the 1970s, the need for the railway had been increasing as the development of Chiba Ichihara New Town was in progress along the planned route. The plan was changed to make connection with the Keisei Chiba Line at Chiba-Chūō Station. Construction of the line began in August 1977 for the section between Chiba-Chūō Station and Chiharadai Station (10.91 km).

Chiba Kyūkō opened the new line between Chiba-Chūō Station and Ōmoridai Station (4.2 km) on April 1, 1992. The line to Chiharadai Station was completed on April 1, 1995. The entire line is single track, but the formation allows for duplication if and when required.

Due to its poor financial condition, Chiba Kyūkō was dissolved and the railway was sold to Keisei Electric Railway on October 1, 1998. Keisei named it the "Chihara Line".

References 

Chihara
Railway lines in Chiba Prefecture
Standard gauge railways in Japan
Railway lines opened in 1992